Scott Township is a township in Johnson County, Iowa, USA. As of the 2020 Census, there were 2,175 people in Scott Township.

History
Scott Township was organized in 1846.

References

Townships in Johnson County, Iowa
Townships in Iowa
1846 establishments in Iowa Territory